Urue-Offong/Oruko is located in the south east of Nigeria and is a Local Government Area of Akwa Ibom State created in September 1991.

Urue-Offong/Oruko is one of the five Oro language speaking Local Government Area bounded in the North West by Okobo, Akwa Ibom, Oron, Akwa Ibom in the North East, bounded in the East by Udung Uko, and in the South East by Mbo, Akwa Ibom and also bounded by Esit Eket in the South West.

History

In September 1991, Urue-Offong/Oruko Local Government Area was carved out of Oron, Akwa Ibom Local Government Area. Urue-Offong/Oruko is made up of six out of the nine clans (Afaha) of the Oron people.

Oruko was the economic capital of the Oron people it was a home to a huge market (Urue Oruko) in the 1800s where several traders from mainly Hausa people, Ilaje, and Igbo people came to sell their goods, an unfortunate event occur where several people died close to Sixty after a huge ancestral tree fell and people died due to stampede in the late 1890s. Again in Urue Oruko, several hundred of Oron people (mostly traders and women) were killed during the Nigerian Civil War in the late 1960s. This unfortunate event has been observed in Oron to be the most tragic in the history of the Nigerian Civil War.

Clans and Settlement

Afaha Ubodung clan which is the largest of all the clan now known as Mbodung District consist of twenty one (21) villages and Towns includes;

Abiak Elibi
Anai Okpo
Edok
Eyetong
Eyo Eyekip
Eyo Okwong
Eyo Ufuo
Eyo Uwesong
Eyo Uya
Eyobiasang
Eyokpifie
Eyulor
Oduonim Isong Inyang
Oduonim Oro
Okossi
Ubodung
Udung Eta
Udung Okpor
Udung Uwe
Ukuda
Urue Offong Town

Afaha Ukwong clan also known as the Ukwong district, that make up the Local government area is the second largest clan in Urue-Ofong/Oruko is made up of five (5) villages or town namely

Ibetong-Eweme
Ikpe
Mbukpo-Eyo-Ima
Mbukpo-Eyakan
Mbukpo-Uko-Akai.

Afaha Ibighi Clan which is known as Ibighi district comprises

Okuku Township
Oyuku Ibighi
Uya Oron
Eyubia anglicised (Oyubia).

Afaha Okuiso clan also known as Okuiso district in the local government is made up of

Atte Oro
Umume

Afaha Ebughu Clan also known as Ebughu district has two villages in the Local Government Area namely

Elei
Ibetong Nsie

And lastly the six Clan which is the Afaha Okpo clan also known as the Afaha District occupy two villages namely

Afaha Okpo Town 
Uboro Oro

Geography

Urue-Offong/Oruko is in the tropical region and has a uniformly high temperature all the year round. The two main seasons are the dry which spans between October and April and wet season which starts around May and ends in September. There are also two prevailing winds – the South-West onshore winds which brings heavy rains and the North- East trade winds blowing across the Sahara Desert, which brings in the dry season.

Natural Resources/People

The people are traditionally fishermen, traders and famers. Although very rich in sea-foods, palm oil and farm crops, the area is also rich in crude oil, much wells, it ranks among the richest in crude oil deposits found in Oro, Mbo, Okobo, Oron and Udung Uko. The other sister Local Government Areas in Oro nation are said to have 92, 86, 66 and 39 such wells respectively, even though actual oil exploration is going on in Mbo. The area also has a large deposit of clay and other solid minerals like gravel, fine stones, silica sand, etc.

Kingship 

Ancient Urue-Offong/Oruko were governed by each Family head who settles every family issues among the family. And this family head in turns represent each family in the Village traditional court, and in turns a Village Head (Offong) is being chosen which is rotatory in the Village Court to represent their Village in the community setting.
 
Today Traditionally, the Urue Offong people have one king that rules over the land. He is known as the Ahta Oro. The Ahta has all the Ofong (Ivong or Ifong) afaha and the paramount rulers as members of his traditional rulers council. Some high chiefs (for example, Ikpoto, Akpaha and Okete Okete) are also recognized by the Ahta's council.
The President-General of the Oron Union worldwide is regarded as the administrative head of the Oron nation and second-in-command at the Ahta's traditional rulers council.

Prominent People

Sir (Ambassador) Etim Jack Okpoyo (First Deputy Governor of Akwa Ibom State, Engineer, businessman and politician).

Late Elder Bassey Jack (Unanaowi) Okpoyo (First Electrical Engineer in Akwa Ibom State and the first man to own a Petrol or Fueling station in Old Cross River State)

Late Comrade Edet Bassey Etienam MFR JP (Foremost Trade Unionist, Two Term Parliamentarian and Philanthropist)

See also

 Oron people
 Oron, Akwa Ibom
 Mbo, Akwa Ibom
 Okobo, Akwa Ibom
 Udung Uko
 Obolo people
 Akwa Ibom State
 Oron Nation

References

Oron people
Places in Oron Nation
Local Government Areas in Akwa Ibom State